Identity crisis is an internal conflict of and search for identity.

Identity crisis may also refer to:

Comics 
 Identity Crisis (DC Comics), a 2004 limited series
 "Spider-Man: Identity Crisis", a 1998 Marvel Comics storyline

Music 
 Identity Crisis (Clea album), 2004
 Identity Crisis (Shelby Lynne album), 2003
 Identity Crisis (Sweet album), 1982
 Identity Crisis (Tedashii album), 2009
 Identity Crisis (Thrice album), 2000
 Identity Crisis, an album by WSTR, 2018

Television and film 
 Identity Crisis (film), a 1989 American comedy film by Melvin Van Peebles

Television episodes
 "Identity Crisis" (Bugs)
 "Identity Crisis" (Columbo)
 "Identity Crisis" (CSI)
 "Identity Crisis" (Danny Phantom)
 "Identity Crisis" (Garfield and Friends)
 "Identity Crisis" (Law & Order: Criminal Intent)
 "Identity Crisis" (NCIS)
 "Identity Crisis" (Numbers)
 "Identity Crisis" (The Outer Limits)
 "Identity Crisis" (Person of Interest)
 "Identity Crisis" (ReBoot)
 "Identity Crisis" (Star Trek: The Next Generation)
 "Identity Crisis" (Superman: The Animated Series)
 "Identity Crisis" (Undergrads)

See also
 Identity disorder
 Identity disturbance
 Personality crisis (disambiguation)